A Numbered Air Force (NAF) is a type of organization in the United States Air Force that is subordinate to a major command (MAJCOM) and has assigned to it operational units such as wings, squadrons, and groups. A Component Numbered Air Force (C-NAF) has the additional role as an Air Force Component Command exercising command and control over air and space forces supporting a Unified Combatant Command. Unlike MAJCOMs, which have a management role, a NAF is a tactical organization with an operational focus, and does not have the same functional staff as a MAJCOM. Numbered air forces are typically commanded by a major general or a lieutenant general.

Numeric designations for Numbered Air Forces are written in full using ordinal words (e.g., Eighth Air Force), while cardinal numerals are used in abbreviations (e.g., 8 AF). Units directly subordinate to a NAF were traditionally numbered 6XX (where XX is the NAF number). For example, the 609th Air Operations Center is a unit subordinate to the Ninth Air Force. This is no longer completely accurate, due to regular reorganization of Wings and Numbered Air Forces.

History

Numbered air forces began as named organizations in the United States Army Air Corps before World War II. The first four NAFs were established as the Northeast, Northwest, Southeast, and Southwest Air Districts on 19 October 1940 to provide air defense for the United States. These Air Districts were redesignated as the 1st, 2nd, 3rd, and 4th Air Forces, respectively, on 26 March 1941.  Over a year after the establishment of the United States Army Air Forces on 20 June 1941, the Arabic numerals were changed to the First, Second, Third, and Fourth Air Forces on 18 September 1942.  Other organizations established during this period and that became Numbered air forces include the Philippine Department Air Force (became Fifth Air Force), the Panama Canal Air Force (became Sixth Air Force), the Hawaiian Air Force (became Seventh Air Force), and the Alaskan Air Force (became Eleventh Air Force). After World War II, the US Air Force continued to use both named and numbered air forces.  While named air forces were used in both tactical and support roles, numbered air forces were generally employed only in tactical roles.

As part of a peacetime restructuring in March 1946, the United States Army Air Forces were reorganized into three major operating commands: the Strategic Air Command (SAC), the Tactical Air Command (TAC), and the Air Defense Command (ADC). These commands reflected the basic air combat missions that evolved during the war, and each reported directly to General Carl Spaatz, the Commanding General, Army Air Forces.  Numbered air forces served as an intermediate headquarters between these commands and the operational wings and groups.  Eleven of the sixteen wartime air forces remained.  The Eighth and Fifteenth Air Forces were assigned to SAC; the Third, Ninth, and Twelfth Air Forces were assigned to TAC; and the First, Second, Fourth, Tenth, Eleventh, and Fourteenth Air Forces were assigned to ADC.  Second Air Force would later be transferred to SAC in 1949. The numbered air forces had both operational and administrative authority, and existed as a command level between major commands and air divisions.  Although variations existed, and number air forces were often reassigned, this basic arrangement persisted throughout the Cold War.

The role of numbered air forces changed in the 1990s during the Air Force reorganization initiated by Air Force Chief of Staff General Merrill McPeak.  The goal of the reorganization was to "streamline, take layers out, flatten (Air Force) organizational charts, while at the same time clarifying the roles and responsibilities of essential supporting functions." Numbered air forces were reorganized into tactical echelons focused on operations, and their administrative staff functions were eliminated.  This reorganization also reduced the number of major commands, and eliminated the air divisions to place numbered air forces directly in command of operational wings.

The role of numbered air forces was again changed in 2006 with the implementation of the Component Air Force (C-NAF) concept. Some numbered air forces have an additional mission as the Air Force Component Command exercising command and control over air and space forces supporting a Unified Combatant Command. C-NAFs have a second designation to identify their role.  For example, First Air Force, a numbered air force assigned to Air Combat Command, is designated as Air Force Northern (AFNORTH) in its role as the air component of the United States Northern Command. Most C-NAFs have an Air and Space Operations Center (AOC) to provide command and control of air and space operations for the supported combatant commander.

List of Air Forces

Numbered
The table below lists current and historical numbered air forces of the US Air Force, their C-NAF designation (if applicable), their current shield and station, and the major command (MAJCOM) to which they are currently assigned.  Note that the lineage of some numbered air forces is continued by non-NAF organizations (e.g., the 15th Expeditionary Mobility Task Force continues the lineage of the Fifteenth Air Force).  Boldface indicates a NAF or C-NAF that is currently active.

Named
Named Air Forces operate at the same level as Numbered Air Forces. General Headquarters Air Force, the first named air force of the United States Army's air arm, began operations in 1935. The GHQ Air Force became the Air Force Combat Command in 1941. Several of the numbered air forces began as named air forces.

Since World War II other named air forces have existed in both operational and support commands. Air Forces Iceland, and the Central, Eastern, Japan, and Western Air Defense Forces, have provided air defense capability. The USAF Special Operations Force controlled operational special forces. The Crew, Flying, and Technical Training Air Forces served Air Training Command both in the air and on the ground. Pacific Air Force/FEAF (Rear) controlled both operational and support forces of Far East Air Forces. Air Materiel Force, European Area, and Air Materiel Force, Pacific Area, on the other hand, served primarily as logistics support establishments.

Since 2001 United States Air Forces Central has supervised U.S. Air Force elements engaged in the War in Afghanistan (2001–2021); since 2003 for the War in Iraq; and, with a more recent start, air refueling and other support in regard to the Yemeni Civil War.

Source:

See also
 Organizational structure and hierarchy of the United States Air Force

References

 
Numbered Air Forces